is a Gerstlauer Euro-Fighter steel roller coaster located at the Fuji-Q Highland theme park in Fujiyoshida, Yamanashi, Japan. It is famous for having a drop angle of 121° – the former steepest coaster in the world before being replaced by TMNT Shellraiser at American Dream in New Jersey. The Japanese name Takabisha translates to "high-handed" or "domineering" in English. The name is a pun, in that the three kanji in the name literally mean "high fly car".

History
On 11 May 2011, Fuji-Q Highland announced to the world that they would be opening Takabisha – the world's steepest roller coaster. Testing for the ride began around 8 June 2011 with media and special invited guests being able to ride Takabisha one month later. The ride officially opened to the public on 16 July 2011.

Ride
Takabisha is a custom Gerstlauer Euro-Fighter roller coaster. The  ride begins with a sudden drop into pitch black darkness before entering a slow heartline roll. It then exits out of the station building and directly into a large inverted top hat. Immediately following the exit of this inversion the car goes into a banana roll, corkscrew and then two airtime hills. The ride is slowed on a set of block brakes and returns into the station building. The track then turns a sharp 180° turn to the right before going back out of the building and onto the vertical chain lift hill. Once at the top, the car slowly inches towards the record-breaking 121°, beyond-vertical drop. Once the car is released from the top of the hill, it hurtles back down towards the ground and enters a dive loop, an inline loop and finally the seventh inversion, an immelmann loop. The whole ride is over within 2 minutes.

Records
When Takabisha opened on 16 July 2011 it gained the Guinness World Record for the steepest roller coaster made from steel. It officially took the world record from Fraispertuis City's Timber Drop S&S Worldwide El Loco roller coaster, which had gained the record only two weeks earlier. Timber Drop's record was set at 113.1° while Takabisha's drop measures at an angle of 121°.

See also
 2011 in amusement parks

References

External links
 Fuji-Q Highland official website
 Euro-Fighter on the Gerstlauer official website
 

Roller coasters in Japan